The 1945 Cotton Bowl Classic featured the TCU Horned Frogs and the Oklahoma A&M Cowboys.

Background
Oklahoma A&M won the Missouri Valley Conference and had only lost to Norman NAS (a naval team). TCU was lucky to be there, with a 7–2–1 record and 3–1–1 conference record. This was Oklahoma A&M's first bowl game.

Game summary
The game started with and ended with an Oklahoma A&M touchdown. Bob Fenimore had two touchdown runs with additional touchdowns by Jim Spavital, Joe Thomas, and Mack Creage the game was dominated by A&M, who had long drives of 59, 61, 62, 40, and 66 all result in touchdowns while TCU turned the ball over twice and let Oklahoma A&M run the ball 60 times in one of the more lopsided Cotton Bowl games.

Aftermath
Oklahoma A&M would win the Sugar Bowl the year after, but they would not reach another Cotton Bowl until 2003 (now known as Oklahoma State) and has not won one since the 1945 game.
TCU would reach the Cotton Bowl four more times from 1951 to 1958.

References

Cotton Bowl Classic
Cotton Bowl Classic
Oklahoma State Cowboys football bowl games
TCU Horned Frogs football bowl games
Cotton Bowl
January 1945 sports events in the United States